The University of Szczecin is a public university in Szczecin, western Poland. It is the biggest university in West Pomerania, with 33,267 students and a staff of nearly 1,200. It consists of 9 faculties:

 Faculty of Humanities
 Faculty of Law and Administration
 Faculty of Natural Sciences
 Faculty of Mathematics and Physics
 Faculty of Economics and Management
 Faculty of Management and Economics of Services
 Faculty of Theology
 Faculty of Geosciences
 Faculty of Philology

Since 1998, the University has been taking part in the Erasmus student exchange programme.

University of Szczecin faculties

References

External links 

 

 
Universities in Poland
Educational institutions established in 1984
1984 establishments in Poland